Kapustyntsi is the name of villages in Ukraine, Eastern Europe:

 Kapustyntsi (Borschiv raion)
 Kapustyntsi (Yagotyn raion)